FC Kharkiv was a professional football club based in Kharkiv, Ukraine.
After 2009–10 Ukrainian First League season the club was relegated to the Ukrainian Second League. However, they failed attestation when they submitted falsified documents to the Attestation Committee of the Football Federation of Ukraine and their professional license was withdrawn.

History 
The current club was renamed in 2005, when it was promoted to the Vyscha Liha for the first time. Originally the club entered the Ukrainian Professional League in the Druha Liha Group C in the 1999–2000 season as FC Arsenal Kharkiv.

Arsenal Kharkiv was promoted to the Persha Liha after finishing 2nd in the Druha Liha Group C in 2001/02 season. After a 2nd-place finish in the 2004–05 Persha Liha, Arsenal Kharkiv was promoted to the Vyshcha Liha for the first time and prior to the season the club was bought by new management and they renamed the team to FC Kharkiv. The newly established club presented three teams in the Ukrainian competitions, the senior squad competed in the Top League, the second team (FC Kharkiv-2) competed in the Second League, while another reserve squad (FC Kharkiv-d) competed in the special Reserve competitions.

In the 2006–07 season the senior team finished 12th, while the team's forward Oleksandr Hladky became the top goalscorer of the season with 13 goals. The club's home ground Dynamo Stadium was under repair for some of the 2008–09 season forcing them to move to Sumy and play in the Yuvileiny Stadium. The club struggled in the Premier League that season and eventually relegated to the Persha Liha. On 13 July 2010 the club was officially excluded from among the professional clubs of Ukraine.

Football kits and sponsors

Famous players 

 Yevgen Cheberyachko
 Oleksandr Hladkyi
 Rustam Khudzhamov
 Oleksandr Maksymov
 Oleksandr Yatsenko
 Andriy Smalko
  Abbe Ibrahim

Head coaches

League and Cup history

FC Kharkiv
{|class="wikitable"
|-bgcolor="#efefef"
! Season
! Div.
! Pos.
! Pl.
! W
! D
! L
! GS
! GA
! P
!Domestic Cup
!colspan=2|Europe
!Notes

|-
|align=center|1999–2005
|align=center colspan=13| Refer to FC Arsenal Kharkiv
|-
|align=center|2005–06
|align=center|1st
|align=center|13
|align=center|30
|align=center|9
|align=center|6
|align=center|15
|align=center|29
|align=center|36
|align=center|33
|align=center|1/16 finals
|align=center|
|align=center|
|align=center|
|-
|align=center|2006–07
|align=center|1st
|align=center|12
|align=center|30
|align=center|8
|align=center|9
|align=center|13
|align=center|26
|align=center|38
|align=center|33
|align=center|1/8 finals
|align=center|
|align=center|
|align=center|
|-
|align=center|2007–08
|align=center|1st
|align=center|14
|align=center|30
|align=center|6
|align=center|9
|align=center|15
|align=center|20
|align=center|32
|align=center|27
|align=center|1/16 finals
|align=center|
|align=center|
|align=center|
|-
|align=center|2008–09
|align=center|1st
|align=center|16
|align=center|30
|align=center|2
|align=center|9
|align=center|19
|align=center|19
|align=center|50
|align=center|12
|align=center|1/8 finals
|align=center|
|align=center|
|align=center bgcolor=pink|Relegated
|-
|align=center|2009–10
|align=center|2nd
|align=center|17
|align=center|34
|align=center|3
|align=center|5
|align=center|26
|align=center|23
|align=center|76
|align=center|14
|align=center|1/16 finals
|align=center|
|align=center|
|align=center bgcolor=pink|Relegated
|}

FC Kharkiv-2
{|class="wikitable"
|-bgcolor="#efefef"
! Season
! Div.
! Pos.
! Pl.
! W
! D
! L
! GS
! GA
! P
!Domestic Cup
!colspan=2|Europe
!Notes

|-
|align=center|2005–06
|align=center|3rd
|align=center|13
|align=center|24
|align=center|0
|align=center|3
|align=center|21
|align=center|12
|align=center|60
|align=center|3
|align=center|
|align=center|
|align=center|
|align=center bgcolor=pink|Dissolved
|}

See also 
FC Dynamo Kharkiv
FC Metalist Kharkiv
FC Helios Kharkiv
FC Arsenal Kharkiv
FC Hazovyk-KhGV Kharkiv
FC Kharkiv Reserves and Youth Team

References

External links 
 Official site
Ukrainian Soccer Team Kharkiv
Ukraine Soccer

 
Kharkiv
Association football clubs established in 2005
2005 establishments in Ukraine
Kharkiv
Association football clubs disestablished in 2010
2010 disestablishments in Ukraine